Madhosh is a 1974 Bollywood drama film directed by Desh Gautam. It stars Mahendra Sandhu and Aamir Khan as young Raj Kumar.

Cast
 Mahendra Sandhu as Raj Kumar
 Reena Roy as Meenal
 Rakesh Roshan as Goldie
 Helen as Mona
 Johnny Walker as Gor
 Jayshree T. as Munni Bai
 Aamir Khan as younger Raj

Music 
The music has done by R. D. Burman. All lyrics by Majrooh Sultanpuri.

References

External links 
 

Films scored by R. D. Burman
1974 drama films
Indian drama films
1970s Hindi-language films